Albert & Herbert was a Swedish comedy series that ran in 1974, 1976–79, 1981–82, an advent series, and a theatre play titled Mordet på Skolgatan 15, and had a spin-off series in 1995. Albert & Herbert, which featured father-and-son scrap dealers living together, was an adaptation of Ray Galton and Alan Simpsons's BBC series Steptoe and Son from the 1960s and 1970s.

Albert was played by Sten-Åke Cederhök, and the son Herbert was played by Tomas von Brömssen. During the first six episodes,  Herbert was played by Lennart Lundh. The characters lived in a dilapidated wooden house in Skolgatan 15, in Haga, Gothenburg.

References

External links

1970s Swedish television series
1980s Swedish television series
1974 Swedish television series debuts
1982 Swedish television series endings
Swedish television sitcoms
Television shows set in Gothenburg
Steptoe and Son
Television shows set in Sweden